Mortgage Corporation v Shaire  [2001] Ch 743  is a widely reported English land law case relating to the Trusts of Land and Appointment of Trustees Act 1996. Such a status specifically flowed from an instance of non est factum mortgage fraud where the mortgage lender and the defrauded co-owner wished to accelerate and delay sale respectively.  The case is relevant to matrimonial law in that the respective equitable shares in the home awarded to Mrs Shaire and Mr Fox in 1987 matrimonial proceedings were never defined and it fell to the court to define these.

The parties accepted the settled law of mortgages that the mortgage could only be applied against the defrauding co-owner's share, not against the innocent co-owner who was duped and was without knowledge of the mortgage loan.

The court made broad, reasoned announcements on the end of the old law and old doctrine of "trusts for sale". The extent of co-ownership was a side issue, determined also by the case. It fixed the Mrs Shaire's share at 75% and her partner for the past three-to-four years at 25%.

Facts
Mr Marvin Fox and Marsha Shaire lived at 74 Winchmore Hill Road, London N14 as joint tenants following a transfer at the time of the divorce proceedings in 1987. Mr Fox died in 1992, and it transpired he had forged Mrs Shaire's signature, and mortgaged the property to Mortgage Corporation. It was accepted their charge was valid against his share. However, payments were not met and the bank applied for a possession order under TLATA 1996 section 14. Mrs Shaire argued that under section 15 her interest should prevail over those of the creditors.

Judgment
Neuberger J held that Parliament intended with Trusts of Land and Appointment of Trustees Act 1996 (ToLATA) s 15 to replace trusts for sale with trusts of land, and thus give the court more discretion and 'to tip the balance somewhat more in favour of families and against banks and other charges'. The interest of the chargee was just one factor, and there was no suggestion that it should be given more weight. It was in the court's discretion. In the circumstances, the court would not make an order until the parties had had an opportunity to consider the consequences of the court's conclusions on the law. Old cases should be treated with caution.

Instead, the claimant's interest should be converted to a loan for Mrs Shaire to pay off over time. If she could not meet the requirements of the loan, then the court would order a sale, but only after consideration had been given to properties available to Mrs Shaire with the money that would be realised upon sale of the house. The court also held that Mrs Shaire would never have intended for Mr Fox to have a 50% interest in the property, and therefore set his share at 25%.

See also

English property law
English trusts law

References
References

Notes

2001 in England
2001 in case law
English property case law
English trusts case law
High Court of Justice cases
English land case law
2001 in British law